This article contains information about the literary events and publications of 1572.

Events
January 3 – James Burbage, on behalf of Leicester's Men, writes to their patron, Robert Dudley, 1st Earl of Leicester, requesting that they be given the special status of "household servants".
unknown dates
Vagabonds Act in England prescribes punishment for rogues. This includes actors' companies lacking formal patronage.
George Gascoigne becomes a "soldier of fortune" in the Low Countries.

New books
Remy Belleau – La Bergerie (2nd edition)
Rafael Bombelli – L'Algebra
John Field – A View of Popish Abuses yet remaining in the English Church
Libro d'Oro of Corfu
Bishops' Bible (revised version)

New drama
Jean de la Taille – Saül le furieux

Poetry
Luís de Camões – Os Lusiadas
Fernando de Herrera – Canción por la Victoria del Señor don Juan
Thomas Palfreyman – Divine Meditations

Births
January 7 – Antoine de Gaudier, French Jesuit theologian (died 1622)
January 22 (earliest possible date) – John Donne, English poet and Dean of St Paul's (died 1631)
June 11 (approximate) – Ben Jonson, English Renaissance dramatist, poet and actor (died 1637)
July 25 – Theodorus Schrevelius, Dutch Golden Age poet (died 1649)
Unknown date – James Mabbe, English scholar, poet and translator (died 1642)

Deaths
March 27 – Girolamo Maggi, Italian poet and polymath (born c. 1523)
April 12 – Jean Crespin, French martyrologist and printer (born c. 1520)
June 28 – Johannes Goropius Becanus, Dutch humanist writer and linguist (born 1519)
September 23 – Henry Scrimgeour, Scottish diplomat and book collector (born 1505)
September – Denis Lambin, French classicist (born 1520)

References

Years of the 16th century in literature